Oulchy-le-Château is a commune in the Aisne department in Hauts-de-France in northern France.

Geography
It is directly accessible by highway.

Towns, villages and localities
Cugny-lès-Crouttes, located to the east

History
On the night of 2/3 March 1814, the area was taken by imperial troops commanded by Captain Parquin. In 1976, the commune of Cugny-lès-Crouttes was absorbed.

Population

Sights
War memorial, on which 41 names are inscribed
War memorial of Cugny-lès-Crouttes, on which 5 names are inscribed
Monument in memory of Captain Parquin
Many public baths
The Ghosts of Landowski - 1919-1935 by Paul Landowski.

Personalities
Gérard Titus-Carmel, painter and poet, lived and worked in the commune for more than thirty years

Economics and sports
The village contains a bakery, supermarket, butcher shops, pharmacy, doctor, nightclub, police, garage and gasoline. The town contains a football stadium and two tennis courts.

See also
Communes of the Aisne department
List of medieval bridges in France

References

Communes of Aisne